Jagath Kiladi is a 1998 Indian Kannada language action comedy film starring Jaggesh, Charulatha and Pavithra Lokesh in the lead roles. The film produced by Sudha Srinivasan for S&S Cinemas was directed by Chikkanna. The  film was based on the Bollywood film, Gopi Kishan which itself is a remake of the Tamil film Avasara Police 100. The then popular comedian Sarigama Viji who also played a supporting character penned the dialogues. The film has a musical score by Rajan–Nagendra.

Actor Jaggesh appeared in two roles, one as a timid and dim-witted cop and the other as a smart, witty and courageous ex-convict. B. S. Kemparaj edited the film while Ramesh Babu handled the cinematography. The film was a moderate success at the box office.

Synopsis 
Vijay, an honest but timid Head Constable is ridiculed by everyone around him including his son. His superior Sub Inspector Thirupathi is an equally incompetent officer. Meanwhile, Bhaskar a hardened criminal is released after 14 years and reunites with his mother. He is shocked to learn that his supposedly dead father is still alive and has grown to be a dangerous criminal. While his mother was pregnant Bhaskar's father, Dharmaraj, who was an honest person, robbed a temple and killed someone in the process. Bhaskar is disturbed and tries to avenge his wrongdoings. In the process, he comes across Thirupathi who mistakes him for Vijay and persuades him to catch a criminal. While Thirupathi gets a transfer to Raichur, a clueless Vijay is promoted to Sub Inspector post for Bhaskar's brave deed. Bhaskar has already learned about his dim-witted look alike and decides to use the situation to his benefit and what happens later forms the crux of the story.

Cast 
Jaggesh 
Charulatha
Pavithra Lokesh 
B. V. Radha
M. N. Lakshmi Devi
Loknath
Shani Mahadevappa
G. K. Govinda Rao 
Nagaraj Kote
Sudheer
Sathyajith
Agro Chikkanna 
Stunt Devu 
Mandya Ramesh
Sarigama Viji

Soundtrack 

The Rajan–Nagendra duo scored and composed the film's soundtrack while Narendra Babu, Geethapriya, J. M. Prahlad and Shyamsundar Kulkarni penned the lyrics.
 "Sundaraangi" by S. P. B.
 "Musukeththabeda" by S. P. B., Anuradha Sriram
 "Jokumara Jodiyagi" by S. P. B., Anuradha Sriram
 "I Love for you" by Jaggesh, Anuradha Sriram

Release 
The film was released in 1998 to positive reviews. The film received  a U Certificate after 3 cuts from the Bangalore regional office of censor board with the certificate dated 22 June 1998.

References

External links 
 

1998 films
Indian action comedy films
Films scored by Rajan–Nagendra
Kannada remakes of Tamil films
1990s Kannada-language films
1998 action comedy films